A verse is formally a single metrical line in a poetic composition. However, verse has come to represent any grouping of lines in a poetic composition, with groupings traditionally having been referred to as stanzas.

Verse in the uncountable (mass noun) sense refers to poetry in contrast to prose. Where the common unit of verse is based on meter or rhyme, the common unit of prose is purely grammatical, such as a sentence or paragraph.

Verse in the second sense is also used pejoratively in contrast to poetry to suggest work that is too pedestrian or too incompetent to be classed as poetry.

Types of verse

Rhymed verse
Rhymed verse is historically the most commonly used form of verse in English. It generally has a discernible meter and an end rhyme.
    I felt a Cleaving in my Mind –
    As if my Brain had split –
    I tried to match it – Seam by Seam –
    But could not make them fit.

    The thought behind, I strove to join
    Unto the thought before –
    But Sequence ravelled out of Sound
    Like Balls – upon a Floor.
                                              —Emily Dickinson

Blank verse 
Blank verse is poetry written in regular, metrical, but unrhymed, lines, almost always composed of iambic pentameters.
    Of man's first disobedience, and the fruit
    Of that forbidden tree, whose mortal taste
    Brought death into the world, and all our woe,
    With loss of Eden, till one greater man
    ....
                                              —John Milton (from Paradise Lost)

Free verse 
Free verse is usually defined as having no fixed meter and no end rhyme. Although free verse may include end rhyme, it commonly does not.
    Whirl up, sea—
    Whirl your pointed pines
    Splash your great pines
    On our rocks,
    Hurl your green over us,
    Cover us with your pools of fir.
                                              —H.D.

References

Further reading 
 

Linguistics
Stanzaic form
Poetic rhythm